
British NVC community MG9 (Holcus lanatus - Deschampsia cespitosa grasslands) is one of the mesotrophic grassland communities in the British National Vegetation Classification system. It is one of three communities associated with poorly drained permanent pastures.

It is a widespread community throughout the British lowlands. There are two subcommunities.

Community composition

The following constant species are found in this community:
 Tufted Hair-grass (Deschampsia cespitosa  ssp. cespitosa)
 Yorkshire-fog (Holcus lanatus)

No rare species are associated with this community.

Distribution

This community is widespread in lowlands throughout Britain.

Subcommunities

There are two subcommunities:
 the Poa trivialis subcommunity
 the Arrhenatherum elatius subcommunity

References

 Rodwell, J. S. (1992) British Plant Communities Volume 3 - Grasslands and montane communities  (hardback),  (paperback)

MG09